Sheldon Turner is a screenwriter and producer. His produced credits as a screenwriter include The Longest Yard (2005), The Texas Chainsaw Massacre: The Beginning (2006), Up in the Air (2009) and X-Men: First Class (2011). He is an alum of Cornell University in Ithaca, NY.

Turner was featured in The Dialogue interview series. In this 90-minute interview with producer Mike DeLuca, Turner charts his detour from law school to screenwriting. Turner will be writing the live action Splinter Cell film. His production company Vendetta Productions recently signed a first-look deal with A+E Studios.

Awards
Up in the Airs script won:
 The BAFTA Awards for Best Adapted Screenplay
 The Golden Globe Awards for Best Screenplay
 The Writers Guild award for Best Adapted Screenplay

 The Broadcast Film Critics award for Best Adapted Screenplay
 The Chicago Film Critics award for Best Adapted Screenplay
 The Dallas-Fort Worth Film Critics for Best Screenplay
 The Denver Film Critics Society award for Best Adapted Screenplay
 The Florida Film Critics award for Best Screenplay
 The Houston Film Critics award for Best Screenplay
 The Indiana Film Critics award for Best Screenplay
 The Kansas City Film Critics award for Screenplay
 The Los Angeles Film Critics award for Screenplay
 The National Board of Review award for Best Adapted Screenplay
 The Oklahoma Film Critics award for Best Screenplay - Adapted
 The Southeastern Film Critics award for Best Adapted Screenplay
 The Toronto Film Critics award for Best Screenplay (tie)
 The Washington D.C. Area Film Critics award for Best Screenplay, Adapted

References

External links

Dialogue: Learn from the Masters Interview
 Variety article on Rick James deal
 Variety article on Up In The Air spec sale

Living people
Year of birth missing (living people)
21st-century American male writers
American film producers
American male screenwriters
Best Adapted Screenplay BAFTA Award winners
Best Screenplay Golden Globe winners
21st-century American screenwriters